was a divine canoe made of pounamu in Ngāi Tahu's Māori mythology.

The chiefs who travelled to New Zealand in her were Peki(te)tahua, Rongokahe, Rangitatau, Hineraho, Te Rangitamau, Taewhenua, Te Mikimiki (Te Mingimingi), Atua-whakanihoniho, Te Atua-whakataratara, and Whakarewa.  may have also been the name of the  that was brought along with the canoe.

References

See also 

 Āraiteuru
 Ngahue
 Tākitimu
 Uruaokapuarangi

Māori waka
Māori mythology